Pilipinas HD is a Philippine free-to-air television channel that broadcasts cultural programming. During its initial broadcast from June 12 (Philippine Independence Day) until August 31, 2016, Chino Trinidad rented a satellite space to all subscription providers to be able to watch by the viewing public free of charge.

On September 1, 2016, Pilipinas HD was launched on digital terrestrial television it signed a blocktime deal with Broadcast Enterprises and Affiliated Media, Inc. However, unlike its pay-TV counterpart, BEAM TV handles and supplies the channel's programming on a dedicated subchannel.

Programs
This is a list of programs to be aired on the channel's initial run:

Decoding Duterte - a documentary series on the biography of President Rodrigo Duterte
Duyan ka Magiting (Cradle of Noble Heroes) - a series featuring the forgotten national heroes
Pamana - a series on the Filipino families
Filipiknow - a series on Philippine history, facts and trivias
Grid - a travel and magazine show which will feature travel destinations in the country
Panahon.TV - a weather news program featuring live updates from PAGASA (also airs on DZRH News Television, Life TV Asia, and One PH)
Panatang Pilipino - a series that tells the aspirations and dreams of ordinary Filipinos
Oras Ng Himala - a religious program produced by Jesus is our Shield Worldwide Ministries led by Apostle Renato D. Carillo
Ugat ng Lahi - a series on the rich tradition of the Filipino indigenous tribes
Storya ng Bayan - a series that visit places and towns that have colorful history and its heroes
Sa Ngalan ng Katotohanan - a documentary series on the biography of President Emilio Aguinaldo during the revolution on his 150th birth anniversary.

References

Television channels and stations established in 2016
Filipino-language television stations
Television networks in the Philippines